Teddy Teuma (born 30 September 1993) is a professional footballer who plays as a midfielder and captains Belgian club Union SG. Born in France, he represents the Malta national team.

Club career
On 27 July 2018, the first matchday of the 2018–19 season, Teuma made his Ligue 2 debut with Red Star F.C. in a 2–1 home defeat to Niort.

In January 2019, he signed a 2.5-year contract with Royale Union Saint-Gilloise.

On 13 October 2022, Teuma signed an extension with RUSG until 2025.

International career
Born in France, Teuma is of Maltese descent and holds a Maltese passport. On 28 August 2020, he received a first call up to the Malta national team.

Career statistics

Club

International
Scores and results list Malta's goal tally first, score column indicates score after each Teuma goal.

Honours
Red Star
Championnat National: 2017-18

Union SG
Belgian First Division B: 2020-21
Belgian First Division A Runner-up: 2021-22

References

External links
 
 
 

1993 births
Living people
Association football midfielders
People with acquired Maltese citizenship
Maltese footballers
Malta international footballers
French footballers
French people of Maltese descent
Ligue 2 players
Championnat National players
Championnat National 2 players
Championnat National 3 players
Belgian Pro League players
Challenger Pro League players
Hyères FC players
US Boulogne players
Red Star F.C. players
Royale Union Saint-Gilloise players
French expatriate footballers
Maltese expatriate footballers
Expatriate footballers in Belgium
Maltese expatriate sportspeople in Belgium
French expatriate sportspeople in Belgium
Sportspeople from Toulon
Footballers from Provence-Alpes-Côte d'Azur